Lindsay Davenport was the defending champion, but lost to Maria Sharapova in the semifinals.

Justine Henin-Hardenne won the title, defeating Sharapova in the final, 7–5, 6–2.

Seeds
The top four seeds received a bye into the second round.

Draw

Finals

Top half

Bottom half

External links
Main and qualifying draw

Dubai Tennis Championships - Singles
2006 Dubai Tennis Championships